The North Carolina Community College System (System Office) is a statewide network of 58 public community colleges. The system enrolls over 500,000 students annually. It also provides the North Carolina Learning Object Repository as a central location to manage, collect, contribute, and share digital learning resources for use in traditional or distance-learning environments.

History
In the years following World War II, North Carolina began a rapid shift from an agricultural to an industrial economy. With that change came an awareness that a different kind of education was needed in the state. People who did not desire a four-year baccalaureate education nevertheless had the need for more than a high-school diploma.

In 1950, the State Superintendent of Public Instruction authorized a study of the need for a system of tax-supported community colleges. The resulting report, by Dr. Allan S. Hurlburt, was published in 1952. It proposed a plan for development of state supported community colleges. In 1957, the North Carolina General Assembly adopted the first Community College Act and provided funding for community colleges.

The same (1957) General Assembly also provided funding to initiate a statewide system of industrial education centers, to train adults and selected high-school students in skills needed by industry. By 1961, the five public junior colleges were emphasizing arts and sciences, and seven industrial education centers were focusing on technical and vocational education.

In 1961, North Carolina Governor Terry Sanford appointed a Governor's Commission on Education Beyond the High School with Irving E. Carlyle as its chairman. Commonly referred to as the "Carlyle Commission", the body produced a set of proposals in August 1962 aimed at increasing college enrollment in North Carolina. One of its recommendations was the consolidation of the state's "public junior colleges" and "industrial education centers" under a single system of community colleges. In May 1963, the General Assembly responded by creating a Department of Community Colleges under the State Board of Education.

By 1966,  43 institutions had 28,250 full-time equivalent (FTE) enrollments. In 1969, 54 institutions had 59,329 FTEs. The system had grown very rapidly, exceeding 10% annually nearly every year until the late 1970s; in 1974-75, growth reached 33%. The system continues to grow in enrollments nearly every year, but by much more modest margins. The number of colleges has not increased since Brunswick Community College became the 58th in 1978. In 1991, the North Carolina Center for Applied Textile Technology became subject to the management of the North Carolina State Board of Community Colleges.  In July 2005, Gaston College, part of the North Carolina Community College System, absorbed the textile center.

The original legislation placed the community college system under the purview of the State Board of Education, and created a State Department of Community Colleges. In the early years of the system, the State Board of Education chairperson was Dallas Herring; David Bruton succeeded him in 1977.

In 1979, the General Assembly changed the state control of the system. Provision was made for a separate State Board of Community Colleges. The board was appointed and organized in 1980, and met several times with the State Board of Education. The new board assumed full responsibility for the system on January 1, 1981. The board's first chairperson was Duke Power Company executive Carl Horn. He was succeeded in 1983 by John A. Forlines, president of Bank of Granite and then by William F. Simpson in 1989. Lt. Governor Dennis A. Wicker served as chair from 1993 until 1999. Dr. G. Herman Porter, former president of Wayne Community College, served from 1999 until 2001. Businessman James J. Woody, Jr., of Roxboro served from 2001 until July 2005. Progress Energy executive Hilda Pinnix-Ragland served four terms from 2005 to 2013.  She was succeeded as chair by Dr. Linwood Powell of Fayetteville in 2013. Businessman Scott Shook of Greenville served 2015–2019 as chair. The current board chair is Breeden Blackwell of Fayetteville, a retired school principal and elected city and county official. The board vice chair is Bill McBrayer, a furniture-company executive from Hickory.

In 1988, the North Carolina Community College System celebrated its 25th anniversary, recognizing that in its first quarter century of service, the system had emerged as the nation's third-largest community college network, educating millions of students during its 32-year history and employing thousands of faculty and staff.

System presidents
 the North Carolina Community College System has had 10 presidents, originally called directors of the Department of Community Colleges:
Isaac Ready (19631970)
Ben E. Fountain, Jr. (19711978)
Charles R. Holloman (acting) (September 1978July 1979)
Larry J. Blake (19791982)
Robert W. Scott (19831995)
Lloyd V. Hackley (19951997)
Martin Lancaster (19972008)
Scott Ralls (20082015)
George Fouts (interim) (2015July 2016)
Jimmie Williamson (20162017)
Jennifer Haygood (acting) (October 2017April 2018)
Peter Hans (20182020)
Bill Carver (interim) (Aug. 1, 2020Jan. 11, 2021)
Thomas Stith III (Jan. 11, 2021Jul. 22, 2022)
Bill Carver (interim) (Jul. 25, 2022present)

Colleges

See also
University of North Carolina System
List of colleges and universities in North Carolina

References

Works cited

External links
Official Site of the North Carolina Community College System
College Map

 
 
1963 establishments in North Carolina